Peringia ulvae (or Hydrobia ulvae), common name the Laver spire shell or mudsnail, is a European species of very small aquatic snail with gills and an operculum, a gastropod mollusk in the family Hydrobiidae.

This is arguably a marine snail, but it is often also listed as a non-marine species because it tolerates brackish water and lives in salt marshes and similar habitats.

Peringia ulvae is the type species of the genus Peringia.

Distribution
This species occurs on the coasts of the Baltic Sea, the White Sea the Eastern Atlantic and the western Mediterranean Sea, (the Mediterranean records may be in error)  including:

 Great Britain
 Ireland
 The Netherlands

The type locality is "on the shores of Flintshire", Wales, United Kingdom. The distribution type is Oceanic Wide Temperate

Description 
This species was originally described by Welsh naturalist Thomas Pennant in 1777. Pennant's original text (the type description) reads as follows:

"T." is an abbreviated word testa from Latin language, that means "shell".

The shell is often heavily corroded, usually whitish with brown peristome present on the last whorl. The shell has 5-7 very weakly convex whorls, that are regularly increasing but not always regularly rounded. The lip is attached to the last whorl.

The width of the shell is 2.5–3 mm. The height of the shell is 4-5.5 mm.

Habitat

Peringia ulvae is a widespread and abundant member of the benthic fauna of estuarine habitats and coastal brackish and salt waters. It is very common in brackish water and saltwater, in estuaries and salt marshes. It is most common in the upper half of the intertidal zone. It tolerates salinity 1.0-3.3 %.

Peringia ulvae seems to prefer more exposed localities with less vegetation than the mudsnails Ecrobia ventrosa and Hydrobia neglecta.

Peringia ulvae feeds on detritus and it also consumes seaweeds directly.

It is pederictional dioecious with sexes being easily identified through dissection. On the west coast of Wales this species has peaks of spawning activity in spring and autumn and produces planktotrophic larvae (veliger) that remain in the plankton for up to four weeks before settlement. This period of development affords the potential for dispersal to new habitats and mixing with geographically separate populations. The species provides an interesting case for molecular analysis as the pelagic dispersal phase raises fascinating questions on gene flow, differentiation, recruitment, and inbreeding, but there remains the potential for self-recruitment of estuarine populations.

One of its natural predators is the Arctic barrel-bubble (Retusa obtusa).
In Ireland Peringia ulvae is an important source of food for overwintering waders.

References
This article incorporates public domain text from references and CC-BY-2.0 text from the reference

Further reading 
 Backeljau T. (1986). Lijst van de recente mariene mollusken van België [List of the recent marine molluscs of Belgium]. Koninklijk Belgisch Instituut voor Natuurwetenschappen: Brussels, Belgium. 106 pp.
 Fish J. D., Fish S. & Foley H. (2000). "The biology of mud snails with particular reference to Hydrobia ulvae". In: British Saltmarshes. Sherwood B. R., Gardiner B. G. & Harris T. (eds.) London, Linnean Society: 165-179.
 Gofas S., Le Renard J., Bouchet P. (2001). Mollusca, in: Costello, M.J. et al. (Ed.) (2001). European register of marine species: a check-list of the marine species in Europe and a bibliography of guides to their identification. Collection Patrimoines Naturels, 50: pp. 180–213.
 Haase M. (1993). "The genetic differentiation in three species of the genus Hydrobia and systematic implications (Caenogastropoda, Hydrobiidae)". Malacologia 35: 389-398.
 Muller Y. (2004). Faune et flore du littoral du Nord, du Pas-de-Calais et de la Belgique: inventaire. [Coastal fauna and flora of the Nord, Pas-de-Calais and Belgium: inventory]. Commission Régionale de Biologie Région Nord Pas-de-Calais: France. 307 pp.
 Горбушин А. М. О видовом составе моллюсков рода Hydrobia (Gastropoda, Prosobranchia) в Белом море //Зоол. журн. – 1993. – Т. 71. – №. 9. – С. 47-56.

External links 

Peringia ulvae at Animalbase taxonomy,short description, distribution, biology,status 
 Peringia ulvae Species account and photograph at Mollusc Ireland.

Hydrobiidae
Molluscs of the Atlantic Ocean
Molluscs described in 1777
Taxa named by Thomas Pennant